The horse latitudes are a geographical area north and south of the equator.

Horse Latitudes may also refer to:

The Horse Latitudes, a 1997 album by the Promise Ring
Horse Latitudes (album), a 2011 album by Jeffrey Foucault
Horse Latitudes (book), a poetry collection by Paul Muldoon
"Horse Latitudes", a song on the album Strange Days by the Doors